Rui Qi "Cecilia" Low (born 1 April 1991) is a Singaporean sailor. She competed in the 49er FX event at the 2020 Summer Olympics.

Sailing career
In 2016, Low and her teammate, Kimberly Lim, participated in the Sailing World Cup in the 49erFX class but without much success, coming in at 8th at Hyeres and 12th at Miami.

With a new coach, Fernando Kuo, Lim and Low came in third at the Trofeo Princesa Sofia sailing regatta held at Palma de Mallorca, Spain in 2017.

In the 2017 Sailing World Cup series, Low and Lim finished in ninth place at Hyères, France. With the results from Trofeo Princesa Sofia, both were able to compete at the Sailing World Cup Final held in Santander. They eventually finished in seventh place.

In 2018, Low and Lim won the gold medal at the 2018 Asian Games in the 49erFX class with one race to spare.

In 2021, Low and Lim participated at the 2020 Summer Olympics in the 49erFX class. The pair became the first Singaporean sailors to participate in a medal race in the Olympics and finished 10th, the best result in sailing for Singapore.

References

External links
 
 

1991 births
Living people
Place of birth missing (living people)
Singaporean female sailors (sport)
Olympic sailors of Singapore
Sailors at the 2020 Summer Olympics – 49er FX
Asian Games medalists in sailing
Asian Games gold medalists for Singapore
Asian Games silver medalists for Singapore
Sailors at the 2010 Asian Games
Sailors at the 2014 Asian Games
Sailors at the 2018 Asian Games
Medalists at the 2010 Asian Games
Medalists at the 2014 Asian Games
Medalists at the 2018 Asian Games
21st-century Singaporean women